Natalie Kerwin (born 15 January 1991) is a New Zealand professional racing cyclist who last rode for Team Virtu Pro–Véloconcept.

Major results
2014
 5th Stage 1(TTT) Women's Tour of New Zealand
2016
 1st Overall UCI World Gran Fondo 19–34 Women 
 12th Lake Taupo Cycle Challenge Women's Classic
 1st Queen of the Mountain

References

External links
 

1991 births
Living people
New Zealand female cyclists
Place of birth missing (living people)
21st-century New Zealand women